Missaukee County is a county located in the U.S. state of Michigan. As of the 2020 Census, the population was 15,052. The county seat is Lake City.

Missaukee County is part of the Cadillac, MI Micropolitan Statistical Area. The county is considered to be part of Northern Michigan.

History

Missaukee County was partitioned from Mackinac County, on April 1st, 1840, due to expected population growth. In 1851, the county was attached to Grand Traverse County for legal purposes. It was subsequently attached to Manistee County in 1855 and Wexford County in 1869, before being organized in its own right in 1871.

Etymology 
Missaukee County may be named after a prominent Ottawa chief, Nesaukee, who signed the treaties of 1831 and 1833. However, it is also said that "Nesaukee" could be interpreted as 'large mouth of the river.'

Geography

Lakes and rivers
There are 33 natural freshwater lakes in Missaukee County. The lakes and streams in much of the county drain into the Muskegon River, which flows generally north to south through its eastern tier of townships. The  Clam River, a tributary of the Muskegon, flows generally west to east through the county. The Reedsburg Dam is located within Missaukee County.

Major highways
 is a short east–west route in the northwest of the county, connecting M-66 near Lake City to US Highway 131 at Manton.
 is an east–west route traversing the Lower Peninsula.
 is a north–south route running from the Indiana border to US Highway 31 in Charlevoix.

Adjacent counties
Kalkaska County - north
Crawford County - northeast
Roscommon County - east
Clare County - southeast
Osceola County - southwest
Wexford County - west
Grand Traverse County - northwest

Demographics

As of the census of 2000, there were 14,478 people, 5,450 households, and 4,043 families residing in the county. There were 8,621 housing units at an average density of 15 per square mile (6/km2). The racial makeup of the county was 97.50% White, 0.20% Black or African American, 0.50% Native American, 0.24% Asian, 0.37% from other races, and 1.19% from two or more races.  1.17% of the population were Hispanic or Latino of any race. 24.6% were of Dutch, 18.3% German, 10.8% American, 10.0% English and 7.4% Irish ancestry. 97.9% spoke English and 1.1% Spanish as their first language.

There were 5,450 households, out of which 34.00% had children under the age of 18 living with them, 62.80% were married couples living together, 7.40% had a female householder with no husband present, and 25.80% were non-families. 21.50% of all households were made up of individuals, and 9.50% had someone living alone who was 65 years of age or older.  The average household size was 2.62 and the average family size was 3.03.

In the county, the population was spread out, with 27.10% under the age of 18, 7.50% from 18 to 24, 27.20% from 25 to 44, 23.40% from 45 to 64, and 14.80% who were 65 years of age or older.  The median age was 38 years. For every 100 females, there were 99.50 males.  For every 100 females age 18 and over, there were 98.00 males.

The median income for a household in the county was $35,224, and the median income for a family was $39,057. Males had a median income of $30,565 versus $20,905 for females. The per capita income for the county was $16,072.  About 8.20% of families and 10.70% of the population were below the poverty line, including 13.20% of those under age 18 and 10.40% of those age 65 or over.

Religion
The Christian Reformed Church in North America is far the biggest denomination in the county with 2,010 members and 7 congregations, almost 50% of the counties population adhere to the CRCNA, followed by the Reformed Church in America with 3 congregations and 830 members, the third is the United Methodist Church with 3 churches and 500 members, the PC(USA) has 2 congregations and 200 members, but the Evangelical Presbyterian Church, the Lutherans (ELCA), baptists are also represented with 1 congregations each. Missaukee County is part of the Roman Catholic Diocese of Gaylord and has 1 congregations and 800 members. There is an Amish community in the county, founded in 2000, with two church districts in 2013.

Government and politics

The county government operates the jail, maintains rural roads, operates the
major local courts, keeps files of deeds and mortgages, maintains vital records, administers
public health regulations, and participates with the state in the provision of welfare and
other social services. The county board of commissioners controls the
budget but has only limited authority to make laws or ordinances.  In Michigan, most local
government functions — police and fire, building and zoning, tax assessment, street
maintenance, etc. — are the responsibility of individual cities and townships.

Elected officials
 Prosecuting Attorney: David DenHouten
 Sheriff: Wilbur "Wil" Yancer
 County Clerk/Register of Deeds: Jessica Nielsen
 County Treasurer: Lori Cox
 Road Commissioners: Jack McGee; Larry Norman; Lonny Lutke

(information as of February 2021)

Election history
Missaukee County is one of Michigan's most strongly Republican counties, and one of the most consistently Republican in the nation since that party was founded. No Democratic presidential candidate has ever won Missaukee County since it was organized: even Lyndon Johnson in 1964 when he swept the Northeast received no more than 42 percent of the county's vote, which made Missaukee Barry Goldwater’s strongest county north or east of the Great Lakes. No Democrat since has received more than Barack Obama's 38 percent in 2008. In 2004, Republican George W. Bush received 68.1% in Missaukee County, his second highest percentage among Michigan's 83 counties. In 2008, Republican candidate John McCain was held down to below 60 percent, the only time and it has happened since 1964 without a strong third-party showing (Ross Perot in both 1992 and 1996) and just the second time since 1936. Regardless, it was still his second-strongest county in Michigan after Ottawa County, as he won by 21 points while Barack Obama carried the state by 16.5 points. In both 2016 and 2020, the county was Donald Trump's strongest in Michigan as he won it both times by more than 50 points. In 2002, Republican gubernatorial nominee Dick Posthumus received 66.1% in Missaukee, which also ranked it as the #2 most Republican county in the state.

Despite its strong Republican leanings, Missaukee County has voted for Democratic gubernatorial candidates on two rare occasions, those being for James Blanchard in 1986 and William B. Fitzgerald Jr. in 1978.

Communities

Cities
 Lake City (county seat)
 McBain

Civil townships

 Aetna Township
 Bloomfield Township
 Butterfield Township
 Caldwell Township
 Clam Union Township
 Enterprise Township
 Forest Township
 Holland Township
 Lake Township
 Norwich Township
 Pioneer Township
 Reeder Township
 Richland Township
 Riverside Township
 West Branch Township

Census-designated place
Falmouth
Jennings

Other unincorporated communities

 Butterfield
 Dinca
 Lucas
 Merritt
 Moddersville
 Moorestown
 Pioneer
 Prosper
 Star City
 Vogel Center

See also
 List of Michigan State Historic Sites in Missaukee County, Michigan
National Register of Historic Places listings in Missaukee County, Michigan

References

Bibliography

Further reading

External links
 County Website
  Missaukee County map (PDF)

 
Michigan counties
1871 establishments in Michigan
Populated places established in 1871